The enzyme (S)-methylmalonyl-CoA hydrolase (EC 3.1.2.17) catalyzes the reaction 

(S)-methylmalonyl-CoA + HO  methylmalonate + CoA

This enzyme belongs to the family of hydrolases, specifically those acting on thioester bonds.  The systematic name of this enzyme class is (S)-methylmalonyl-CoA hydrolase. This enzyme is also called D-methylmalonyl-coenzyme A hydrolase.  This enzyme participates in propanoate metabolism.

References

 

EC 3.1.2
Enzymes of unknown structure